is a former Japanese football player.

Playing career
Daijiro Okuda played for Fujieda MYFC from 2012 to 2015.

References

External links

1989 births
Living people
Meiji University alumni
Association football people from Tokyo
Japanese footballers
J3 League players
Japan Football League players
Fujieda MYFC players
Association football midfielders